"Feel Something" (stylized in all lowercase) is a song by American singer Bea Miller. The single was released by Hollywood Records on June 21, 2019, following the release of previous single "It's Not U, It's Me" with 6LACK. In 2020, the song was later included on the compilation EPs Quarantine, on September 4,  and Sad Boy Hours, on September 18. It was also included on the vinyl release of Miller's EP titled, elated! released in October 2020.

After nearly a year of being released, the song started gaining traction on the social media platform, TikTok, after being included in a fan-made mashup along with the song "Still Don't Know My Name" by British musician Labrinth. Consequently, the song later received playlist support on streaming services such as Apple Music and Spotify, with the song being added to the biggest playlist on the latter's platform, "Today's Top Hits". "Feel Something" was serviced to American Top 40 and hot adult contemporary radios on September 15, 2020.

Promotion
On June 18, 2019, Miller announced the song's release date. On June 20, 2019, Miller announced that the song would be released at midnight and revealed the song's official cover art. The song officially impacted American top 40 and hot adult contemporary radios on September 15, 2020.

Composition and lyrics
"Feel Something" is a futurepop song written by Miller, Mike Sabath, Kennedi Lykken and Justin Tranter, and produced by Mike Sabath. Miller talked about the song: "When you're experiencing pain of any kind, all you want is for it to go away. But weirdly that pain is kind of what makes you feel like a real person, so when nothing is going wrong but it's also not going right and you’re just in the middle, you feel empty. And that's almost worse. That's what I wrote this song about."

Credits and personnel
Credits adapted from Tidal.
Bea Miller – composer, lyricist
Mike Sabath – composer, lyricist, producer, mixer, studio personnel
Justin Tranter – composer, lyricist
Kennedi Lykken – composer, lyricist
Will Quinnell – assistant recording engineer, studio personnel

Release history

Certifications

References

External links
 

2019 singles
2019 songs
Hollywood Records singles
Bea Miller songs
Songs written by Justin Tranter
Songs written by Bea Miller
Songs written by Kennedi Lykken
Songs written by Mike Sabath
Futurepop songs